The Czech diaspora refers to both historical and present emigration from the Czech Republic, as well as from the former Czechoslovakia and the Czech lands (including Bohemia, Moravia and Silesia).  The country with the largest number of Czechs living abroad is the United States.

Communities

 Austria (Vienna)
 Czechs and Slovaks in Bulgaria
 Czechs of Croatia
 Czechs in Poland
 Czechs in Romania
 Czechs in Serbia
 Czech New Zealanders
 Czech South Africans
 Czechs in Ukraine
 Czech migration to France
 Czech migration to the United Kingdom
 Czech diaspora in Israel
 Czech Americans (Baltimore, Omaha, Texas)
 Czech Canadians
 Czech immigration to Mexico
 Czechs in Argentina
 Czech Brazilian
 Czech Australians

Distribution by country
Here is the top 10 countries with most Czech immigrants.

: 503,000

:  89,000

: 82,000

: 65,000

: 36,000

: 21,000

: 16,000

: 14,000

: 11,000

: 11,000

Famous people of Czech descent

 Madeleine Albright, the first woman to become a United States Secretary of State
 Yehuda Bauer, an Israeli historian and scholar of the Holocaust
 Edouard Borovansky, a Czech-born Australian ballet dancer, choreographer and director
 Georgina Bouzova, an English television actress
 Louis Brandeis, an associate justice of the Supreme Court of the United States from 1916 to 1939
 Thomas Cech, a Nobel Laureate in chemistry
 Anton Cermak, the mayor of Chicago, Illinois, from 1931 until his assassination in 1933
 Eugene Cernan, a retired United States Navy officer and a former NASA astronaut and engineer
 Miloš Forman, a Czech-American director, screenwriter, professor, and an emigrant from Czechoslovakia
 André Glucksmann, a French philosopher and writer
 George Halas, a player, coach, owner and pioneer in professional American football
 Hippolyte Havel, a Czech anarchist who lived in Greenwich Village, New York
 Juscelino Kubitschek, a prominent Brazilian politician of Czech descent who was President of Brazil from 1956 to 1961
 Milan Kundera, a writer of Czech origin who has lived in exile in France since 1975, where he became a naturalized citizen in 1981
 Lenka, an Australian singer and songwriter
 Jim Lovell, a former NASA astronaut and a retired captain in the United States Navy
 Felix Moscheles, an English painter, peace activist and advocate of Esperanto
 Kim Novak, is an American actress best known for her performance in the 1958 film Vertigo
 Fredy Perlman, an author, publisher and activist
 Jan Pinkava, a Czech-British animator and film director
 Josef Škvorecký, a leading contemporary Czech writer and publisher who has spent much of his life in Canada
 Tom Stoppard, a British playwright, knighted in 1997
 Roberto Weiss, an Italian-British scholar and historian
 John Zerzan, an American anarchist and primitivist philosopher and author
 Robert Vanasek, an American politician
 Exene Cervenka, an American singer

See also 
 History of the Czech Republic
 List of Czechs

Further reading
 Dejmek, Andrea Theresa. The Canadian Czech Diaspora: Bilingual and Multilingual Language Inheritance and Affiliations, McGill University, 2007.

References

 
European diasporas